Vrbje is a settlement in the Municipality of Žalec in east-central Slovenia. It lies south of Žalec on the left bank of the Savinja River. The area is part of the traditional region of Styria. The municipality is now included in the Savinja Statistical Region.

References

External links

Vrbje at Geopedia

Populated places in the Municipality of Žalec